Vladimir Predbradzensky is a Soviet rower. He won a gold medal at the 1978 World Rowing Championships in Cambridge, New Zealand with the men's coxless four.

References

Year of birth missing (living people)
Soviet male rowers
World Rowing Championships medalists for the Soviet Union
Living people